List of active People's Liberation Army Navy amphibious watercraft is a list of amphibious watercraft currently in service with the People's Liberation Army Navy. The following craft are primarily operated from large amphibious warfare ships such as the Type 071 of the PLAN. They are designed to transport troops and equipment from ship to shore.

Landing craft
 Type 069-class landing craft utility  (NATO designation Yuchin-class) - Approx. 20 in reserve.
 Type 067-class landing craft utility (NATO designation Yunnan-class) - Approx. 120 in reserve.

Landing craft air cushion
 Zubr-class LCAC (NATO designation Pomornik-class) - 4 in active service.
 Type 726 LCAC  (NATO designation Yuyi-class) - 6 in active service.
 Type 724 LCAC (NATO designation Jingsah II-class) - 30 in active service.
 Type 722 II LCAC (NATO designation Jinsha II-class) - Unknown number in active service.

Nomenclature

Naval vessels of PLAN are named per Naval Vessels Naming Regulation (中国海军舰艇命名条例)  that was first issued by the Central Military Commission (CMC) on November 3, 1978, and subsequently revised July 7, 1986.

See also
 List of active People's Liberation Army Navy ships

References

External links
PLA landing ships - historic and current (haijun360.com)

Ships of the People's Liberation Army Navy
China
Lists of ships of China
Amphibious warfare vessel classes
Amphibious warfare vessels of the People's Liberation Army Navy